Bernardo “Narding” Anzures (1928–1949) was a Filipino film actor and convicted murderer.

The son of actors Miguel Anzures and Rosa Aguirre, Anzures had starred in pre–World War II films as a child actor under Sampaguita Pictures & LVN Pictures. After the war, he was paired with Lilian Velez in three films produced by Filippine Films & Philippine Pictures Inc., such as Binibiro Lamang Kita, Ang Estudyante, and Sa Kabukiran which was directed by Velez's husband, Jose Climaco.

In 1948, LVN Pictures decided to cast Jaime de la Rosa as Velez's leading man in her next picture.

Selected filmography

Incident
After a dispute regarding a decision, at past midnight at about 1:00 am of the following day of June 27, 1948, Anzures barged into the home of Velez and stabbed her and a housemaid to death. After the incident, based from the movie film, The Lilian Velez Story: Till Death Do Us Part (1995), Anzures rode a taxicab and he went somewhere to talk to one of the director of LVN Pictures (probably a director for the movie film, Engkantada) for unknown reason he failed since it was still dawn, and then he headed again to another location where the house of LVN matinee idol, Jaime De la Rosa, wanted to talk, but eventually failed. Anzures instead, pranked a taxi driver that there's a flat tire and he attempted to steal a taxicab which he headed south to Laguna province, he headed to Nagcarlan for his first friend for help, but his friend failed, but on the second time, he headed again to the farthest route which he reached to Sta. Cruz, Laguna and needed for help for his second friend, but few hours later, the news has been reaching out nationwide, thru the radio, in search of notable murderer of the famous & promising actress, Lilian Velez, so Anzures' second friend instead, went heading together to surrender him instead to the police office of the same town to send him back to the Quezon City Police District Office.

On June 29, 1948, Anzures was promptly arrested.

Death
On July 19, 1949, Anzures pleaded guilty to two counts of murder. He was sentenced to two sentences of life imprisonment. He died in prison from tuberculosis.

In Popular Culture
In the 1995 Film The Lilian Velez Story, Filipino actor Cesar Montano played the role of Narding Anzures, who murdered actress singer Lilian Velez, which was played by the Sharon Cuneta. It was directed by Carlo J. Caparas and co-produced by Golden Lion Films & VIVA Entertainment.

References

Sources
 
 

20th-century Filipino male actors
20th-century deaths from tuberculosis
Filipino male child actors
Filipino people who died in prison custody
Filipinos convicted of murder
Tuberculosis deaths in the Philippines
People convicted of murder by the Philippines
Prisoners who died in Philippine detention
1928 births
1949 deaths
Filipino male film actors